Savannah Sound is a settlement of 204 people (as of 2010) in Central Eleuthera, the Bahamas. Its chapel was built in 1809. Its high school is called Windermere.

References

Populated places in the Bahamas